is a Japanese manga artist and politician who has served since 2022 as a member of the House of Councillors. He made his professional manga debut in 1993, and is best known as the author of Love Hina (1998–2001) and Negima! Magister Negi Magi (2003–2012), both serialized in Weekly Shōnen Magazine; a sequel to Negima!, UQ Holder!, was serialized from 2013 to 2022. In 2011, Akamatsu founded J-Comi  (now Manga Library Z), a free digital distributor of out-of-print manga.

Akamatsu has been a managing director of the Japan Cartoonists Association since 2018, and is a vocal advocate for protecting freedom of expression in manga and anime from expansions in censorship and copyright law. In the 2022 Japanese House of Councillors election, he won a seat as a candidate for the Liberal Democratic Party in the national proportional representation block on a free expression platform, becoming the first manga creator in the National Diet.

Early life

Ken Akamatsu was born in Nagoya, Aichi Prefecture, on July 5, 1968. His father, a bureaucrat in the Ministry of Agriculture, Forestry and Fisheries, was often transferred, and the family lived in Yamagata, the Kita ward of Tokyo, Kumamoto, Higashikurume, and Kawasaki. Akamatsu attended private Kaijō High School in Shinjuku, Tokyo, and entered Chuo University's Department of Japanese Literature. He has cited Sailor Moon as his introduction to anime and manga. While in college, he was active as a doujinshi creator and sold works at Comiket under the pen name .

Professional manga 
In 1993, Akamatsu won the 50th Shōnen Magazine Newcomer Award for his debut work Hito Natsu no Kids Game, published in Kodansha's Magazine Fresh. The following year, he began serializing A.I. Love You (1994–1997) in the publisher's Weekly Shōnen Magazine. Love Hina, published in the magazine from 1998 to 2001, established his popularity, and in 2001 earned him the 25th Kodansha Manga Award (in the shōnen category). His next work, Negima! Magister Negi Magi, was serialized from 2003 to 2012, also in Weekly Shōnen Magazine. Akamatsu's latest manga serial is UQ Holder!, a sequel to Negima! which debuted in the magazine in 2013; it was later transferred to Bessatsu Shōnen Magazine and concluded in 2022. The volumes of UQ Holder! became the first to carry a "Doujin Mark" indicating explicit author permission for use as a source for fan-made works, the result of a publishing initiative led by Akamatsu.

In 2010, Akamatsu launched a beta test of J-Comi (now Manga Library Z), a free manga download site for out-of-print titles. As the first release, he posted all 14 volumes of Love Hina with six pages of advertising and no digital rights management (DRM) for one month. Manga publishers Kodansha and Shueisha began collaborating with the site after the test, and the site formally launched in 2011. The site gained notoriety later that year when it posted Seiji Matsuyama's  ("My Wife Is an Elementary Student") manga, which Tokyo Vice Governor Naoki Inose had cited as an example of a work that should be restricted for physical sale under Tokyo's recently revised Healthy Development of Youths Ordinance.

As of 2022, Akamatsu's manga have a cumulative circulation of over 50 million worldwide. His Love Hina, Negima! Magister Negi Magi, and UQ Holder! have been adapted as anime series; Negima! has also been adapted as a live-action television series.

Advocacy and politics 
Akamatsu is a vocal advocate for protection of freedom of expression in anime and manga, and has been an opponent of government attempts to expand censorship and copyright law.

In 2011, he warned that proposed changes to copyright law under the proposed Trans-Pacific Partnership (TPP) would "destroy" Japan's derivative doujin scene; he continued to voice his concerns in following years. In 2013, as spokesman of the Japan Cartoonists Association (JCA), he joined other creators in opposing the Liberal Democratic Party (LDP) and its partners' proposed amendment to Japan's child pornography laws, the draft version of which included wholly-fictional depictions such as lolicon manga in its definitions. Akamatsu visited the National Diet and the LDP headquarters to express his concern, and the final bill passed in 2014 without a ban on explicit anime and manga. He was appointed a managing director of the JCA in 2018. In 2019, Akamatsu and the JCA expressed concern on a government subcommittee's plan to expand copyright law, under which downloading or taking screenshots of anime images and illustrations illegally posted to blogs and Twitter would have been made illegal, as would copying and pasting song lyrics. In 2020, Akamatsu was invited to advise legislators in the Diet on the future of manga, stating that "[c]ompared to other countries, Japan's forte is its freedom of creativity" and that "a situation where Japanese works are regulated by foreign standards" should be avoided.

In December 2021, Akamatsu announced a candidacy in the 2022 election for the national proportional representation block of the House of Councillors, the upper house of the Diet, under the LDP banner. He stated that his major goal was to protect creative freedom of expression, and during the election campaign criticized "external pressure" (both foreign and domestic) to regulate Japan's "freedom of expression, especially for manga, anime, and games", elaborating that such regulations need to be "approached with rationality". On July 10, 2022, Akamatsu won a seat after campaigning in person in all 47 prefectures, becoming the first manga creator in the National Diet. An early initiative of his was a task force on a proposed legal framework for preservation of past and present Japanese video games in a playable state.

Personal life 
Akamatsu has no task-based daily schedule for his manga work; instead he works on one page at a time until the whole chapter is finished. When he was younger he could draw one chapter each week, but nowadays he usually draws 18 pages every nine days. Thus, he has time to take a week-long break on four-week intervals while maintaining his weekly publishing schedule. He is married to Kanon Akamatsu, a professional cosplayer and former idol; they have two daughters.

Works

Manga 
  (1993; one-shot, published in Kodansha's Magazine Fresh) 
  (1994–1997; serialized in Kodansha's Weekly Shōnen Magazine)
  (1997; one-shot, published in Kodansha's Weekly Shōnen Magazine)
  (1998–2001; serialized in Kodansha's Weekly Shōnen Magazine)
  (2003–2012; serialized in Kodansha's Weekly Shōnen Magazine)
  (2003–2004; story only, serialized in Kodansha's Magazine Special)
  (2010–2011; story only, serialized in Kodansha's Bessatsu Shōnen Magazine)
 UQ Holder! (2013–2022; serialized in Kodansha's Weekly Shōnen Magazine and later Bessatsu Shōnen Magazine)

Anime 
  (2002; original concept, produced by Xebec)

References

External links 

 
 

 
1968 births
Manga artists from Aichi Prefecture
Chuo University alumni
Living people
Winner of Kodansha Manga Award (Shōnen)
Liberal Democratic Party (Japan) politicians